The 10th Kazakhstan President Cup was played from September 4 to September 8, 2017 in Talgar and Almaty. 8 youth teams participated in the tournament (players were born no earlier than 2001.)

Participants

Venues 
The match of the final took place at the Central Stadium in Almaty. Other matches took place at Field's №1 and №2 in Talgar.

Format 
The tournament is held in two stages. At the first stage, eight teams are divided into two qualification groups (A and B). Competitions of the first stage were held on a circular system. The winners of the groups advance to the final, while the group runners-up meet to determine third place.

Squads

Group stage
All times UTC+6

Group A

Group B

Match for 7th place

Match for 5th place

Bronze medal match

Final

Statistics

Goalscorers 

6 goals
  Zuriko Davitashvili(1 pen.)

4 goals
  Kvicha Kvarheladze
  Kirill Klimov
  Ruslan Roziyev

3 goals
  Dmitriy Savchenko

2 goals
  Galip Arapi
  Giorgi Guliashvili
  Shota Nunikashvili
  Daniyal Zakariya
  Matvey Gerasimov
  Medin Kerezbekov
  Timur Melekestsev
  Akhmadjon Emomali
  Rustam Saidov
  Chonybek Sharipov

1 goal
  Agde Mazari
  Blerind Morino
  Kleis Bojanaj
  Egzon Shila
  Erzlot Kuksi
  Giorgi Lomtadze
  Elguja Zhangveladze
  Viacheslav Shvyrev
  Zhalgas Zhaksylykov
  Khamit Shomil'
  Baizhan Madelkhan
  Fedor Neumyvakin
  Maksim Esim(1 pen.)
  Dmitri Markitesov
  Dmitriy Chernyakov
  Igor' Yurchenko
  Ilya Vorotnikov
  Maxim Petrov
  Nikita Sharkov
  Islam Zoirov
  Sharifbek Rahmatov
  Abdulgaziz Abdulsalomov
  Bobirmirza Ergashev
  Boburbek Sabirov
  Mirjalol Abdumutalov
  Ulugbek Halimov

Awards 

The best player of a tournament
 Khvicha Kvaratskhelia
Goalscorer of a tournament
 Zuriko Davitashvili (6 goals)
The best goalkeeper of a tournament
 Sergei Yeshchenko
The best defender of a tournament
 Danila Prokhin 
The best midfielder of a tournament
 Khamit Shamil
The best forward of a tournament
 Ruslan Roziyev

Prize money 
According to FFK, the prize fund of a tournament will make $15,000. "The teams which took 1, 2 and 3 place will be received, respectively 7,000, 5,000 and 3,000 $.

References 

2017 Kazakhstan President Cup
Kazakhstan President Cup
Kazakhstan President Cup